Arundell James Kennedy Esdaile  (1880 – 22 June 1956) was a British librarian, and Secretary to the British Museum from 1926 to 1940.

Career
Secretary to the British Museum from 1926 to 1940, Esdaile was also president of the Library Association, and editor of its journal, the Library Association Record. In addition, he edited The Year’s Work in Librarianship and Sussex Notes and Queries.

In 1926, he delivered Cambridge University’s Sandars Lectures in Bibliography—one of the major British bibliographical lecture series—on the topic of "Elements of the bibliography of English literature, materials and methods". The lectures were published in 1928 under the title The Sources of English Literature: A Bibliographical Guide for Students.

Esdaile was appointed a CBE (Commander of the Order of the British Empire) in 1952; over a decade earlier, in 1939, the University of Liverpool had conferred on him an honorary doctorate.

Personal life
In 1907, he married the art historian Katharine Ada McDowall, and they had a daughter followed by two sons.

Later life
Esdaile died on 22 June 1956.

Selected publications
Academic works 
 Catalogue of the Fifty Manuscripts & Printed Books Bequeathed to the British Museum by Alfred H. Huth. London: British Museum, 1912.
 A List of English Tales and Prose Romances Printed before 1740. London: Bibliographical Society, 1912.
 A Dictionary of the Printers and Booksellers Who Were at Work in England, Scotland and Ireland from 1668 to 1725. Oxford: Oxford University Press for the Bibliographical Society, 1922.
 The Sources of English Literature: A Bibliographical Guide for Students. Sandars Lectures 1926. Cambridge: Cambridge University Press, 1928. 
 The British Museum Library: A Short History and Survey. Library Association Series of Library Manuals, 9. London: G. Allen and Unwin, 1948.
 National Libraries of the World; Their History, Administration and Public Services. 2nd rev. edn. London: Library Association, 1957.

Poetry
 The Inviolable Shade. Boyle, Son and Watchurst, 1912. 
 Wise Men From the West and Other Poems. Andrew Dakers, 1949.

References

1880 births
1956 deaths
British librarians
Commanders of the Order of the British Empire
Employees of the British Museum